Penn Place, located on Penn Bridge Rd. near Trion, Georgia in Chattooga County, Georgia, was listed on the National Register of Historic Places in 1988.  The listing included two contributing buildings and seven contributing structures.

The main house is a two-story two-over-two house, with a first-floor porch across the front facade.
Outbuildings include a smokehouse and a chicken house.  A mule barn and a corn crib are located across Penn Bridge Road from the rest of the complex.

References

National Register of Historic Places in Georgia (U.S. state)
Buildings and structures completed in 1875
Chattooga County, Georgia